Aleshtar (also Romanized as Alashtar and Alishtār; also known as Qal‘eh ‘Alishtār and Qal‘eh Moz̧affari) is a city in and capital of Selseleh County, Lorestan Province, Iran. At the 2006 census, its population was 77,306, in 12,033 families.

The city is populated by Kurds.

References

Towns and villages in Selseleh County
Cities in Lorestan Province
Kurdish settlements in Iran